
This is a list of players who graduated from the Challenge Tour in 2015. The top 15 players on the Challenge Tour's money list in 2015 earned European Tour cards for 2016.

* European Tour rookie in 2016
T = Tied
 The player retained his European Tour card for 2017 (finished inside the top 111).
 The player did not retain his European Tour card for 2017, but retained conditional status (finished between 112 and 148, inclusive).
 The player did not retain his European Tour card for 2017 (finished outside the top 148).

Elvira earned promotion to the European Tour after his third win of the season in August. Fahrbring and Winther regained their cards for 2017 through Q School.

Winners on the European Tour in 2016

Runners-up on the European Tour in 2016

See also
2015 European Tour Qualifying School graduates

External links 
Final ranking for 2015

Challenge Tour
European Tour
Challenge Tour Graduates
Challenge Tour Graduates